22nd Battalion may refer to:
22nd Battalion (Australia), a World War I ANZAC battalion
2/22nd Battalion (Australia), a World War II Australian infantry battalion
 22nd Battalion (New Zealand), a World War II New Zealand infantry battalion
22nd Battalion (French Canadian), CEF, a World War I battalion that formed part of the Canadian Corps

 22nd Peacekeeping Battalion (Moldova)
 22nd Chemical Battalion (United States)
 22nd (County of London) Battalion (The Queen's)
 22nd Virginia Infantry Battalion
 22nd Motorized Infantry Battalion (Ukraine)

See also
 XXII Corps (disambiguation)
 22nd Division (disambiguation)
 22nd Brigade (disambiguation)
 22nd Regiment (disambiguation)